This is a list of television programs current broadcasts and former broadcasts by Kalaignar .

Upcoming broadcast
Serials

Current Broadcasts

Serials

Former Broadcasts

Comedy Serials

Historical Serials

Police Serials/Crime Serials

Drama Serials

 Abirami (அபிராமி)
 Akka Thangai (அக்கா தங்கை)
 Amudha Oru Aacharyakuri  (அமுதா ஒரு ஆச்சர்யகுறி)
 Anandham Vizhayadum Veedu (ஆனந்தம் விளையாடும் வீடு)
 Appa (அப்பா)
 Appanum Aathalum (அப்பனும் ஆத்தாளும்)
 Asai Nilavu (ஆசை நிலவு)
 Aval Oru Minsaram (அவள் ஒரு மின்சாரம்)
 Azhagana Naatkal (அழகான நாட்கள்)
 Bharathy (பாரதி)
 Bhavani (பவானி)
 Deepangal (தீபங்கள்)
 Dhayam (தாயம்)
 Dum Dum Dum (டூம் டூம் டூம்)
 Gokulathil Seethai (கோகுலத்தில் சீதை)
 Kalyana Parisu (கல்யாண பரிசு)
 Kalyani (கல்யாணி)
 Kannamma (கண்ணம்மா)
 Kurinji Malar (குறிஞ்சி மலர்)
 Latchiyam (லட்சியம்)
 Mahalalkshmi (மகாலட்சுமி)
 Maharasi (மகராசி)
 Manjal Magimai (மஞ்சள் மகிமை)
 Mohini (மோகினி)
 Mullum Malarum (முள்ளும் மலரும்)
 Muthal Mariyathai (முதல் மரியாதை)
 Mythili (மைதிலி)
 Naanal (நாணல்)
 Namma Kudumbam (நம்ம குடும்பம்)
 Nila (நிலா)
 Nayagi (நாயகி)
 Paartha Gnabagam Illayo (பார்த்த ஞாபகம் இல்லையோ)
 Pokkisham (பொக்கிஷம்)
 Poove Sempoove (பூவே செம்பூவே)
 Santhosham (சந்தோஷம்)
 Sathileelavathi (சதிலீலாவதி)
 Seetha (சீதா)
 Senbagam (செண்பகம்)
 Suryaputhri (சூரியபுத்திரி)
 Thangamana Purushan (தங்கமான புருஷன்)
 Thavam (தவம்)
 Thekkathi Ponnu (தெக்கத்தி பொண்ணு)
 Thenmozhiyal (தேன்மொழியால்)
 Thirumagal (திருமகள்)
 Thirumangalyam (திருமாங்கல்யம்)
 Thulasi (துளசி)
 Uravukku Kai Koduppom (உறவுக்கு கை கொடுப்போம்)
 Uyirin Niram Oodha (உயிரின் நிறம் ஊதா)
 Vaadagai Veedu (வாடகை வீடு)
 Vairakkiyam (வைராக்கியம்)
 Vairanenjam (வைரநெஞ்சம்)
 Valaiyosai (வலையோசை)
 Vilakku Vacha Nerathula (விளக்கு வச்ச நேரத்துலே)

Reality Shows 

 Attam Pattam (Season 1 & Season 2) (ஆட்டம் பாட்டம் சீசன் 1 & சீசன் 2)
 Azhage Azhagu (அழகே அழகு)
 Chella Kutties (செல்லக் குட்டிஸ்)
 Chinnathirai Cinema (சின்னத்திரை சினிமா)
 Dhil Dhil Manadhil (தில் தில் மனதில்)
 Ellame Siripputhan (எல்லாமே சிரிப்புதான்)
 Isai Medai (இசை மேடை)
 Gana Kuyil Pattu (கானா குயில் பாட்டு)
 Kalai Kovil (கலை கோவில்)
 Kannadi (கண்ணாடி)
 Kaliyugam (கலியுகம்)
 Little Super Heroes (லிட்டில் சூப்பர் ஹிரோஸ்)
 Maanada Mayilada (Season 1-Season 10) (மானாட மயிலாட சீசன் 1- சீசன் 10)
 Naan Padum Padal (நான் பாடும் பாடல்)
 Nerkonda Paarvai (நேர்கொண்ட பார்வை)
 Nalam Pera (நலம் பெற)
 Nalaya Iyakkunar (Season 1-Season 6) (நாளைய இயக்குனர் சீசன் 1-சீசன் 6)
 Nalla Pesunga Nalladhaye Pesunga (நல்லா பேசுங்க நல்லதை பேசுங்க)
 Odi Vizhaiyadu Pappa (Season 1 & Season 2 & Season 3 & Season 4) (ஓடி விளையாடு பாப்பா சீசன் 1 &  சீசன் 2 & சீசன் 3 & சீசன் 4)
 Paasa Paravaikal (Season 1 & Season 2)  (பாச பறவைகள் சீசன் 1 & சீசன் 2)
 Paatu 10 (பாட்டு 10)
 Paatukku Pattu (பாட்டுக்கு பாட்டு)
 Padavarisai 10 (படவரிசை 10)
 Snegithiye (சிநேகிதியே)
 Suvaiyo Suvai (சுவையோ சுவை)
 Thillu Mullu (தில்லு முல்லு)
 Vannathirai (வண்ணத்திரை)
 Vasul Raani (வசூல் ராணி)
 Vidiyale Vaa (விடியலே வா)

Films

Direct Television Premiere
Kuttram Kuttrame

References

Kalaignar TV
Kalaignar TV